Kenas-unarpe (ケナㇱウナㇻペ) is an Ainu kamuy (god).  She is a blood-drinking monster who preys upon hunters.  However, she is sometimes called upon to assist in childbearing.

Mythology
Kenas-unarpe is said to have emerged from the decomposing tools the gods had used in their making of the earth. She is a monster with a thirst for human blood, and a sister to various poisons and diseases.

She often takes on the appearance of Hasinaw-uk-kamuy, the goddess of the hunt, in order to deceive hunters. She employs this trick to lead a hunter deep into a swamp; when he tires, she turns on him, killing him and drinking his blood. Her likeness to Hasinaw-uk-kamuy is not perfect, however, and she is forced to conceal her face with her long hair.  By this, a wary hunter can recognize Kenas-unarpe and avoid this fate.

Kenas-unarpe's association with blood makes her important in childbearing.  She is sometimes invoked to deal with the pollution of pregnant women by blood or disease, and myths hold that she is a very powerful, though potentially dangerous, counterforce in such cases.

Notes

References
Ashkenazy, Michael. Handbook of Japanese Mythology. Santa Barbara, California: ABC-Clio, 2003.
Etter, Carl. Ainu Folklore: Traditions and Culture of the Vanishing Aborigines of Japan. Chicago: Wilcox and Follett, 1949.
Munro, Neil Gordon. Ainu Creed and Cult. New York: Columbia University Press, 1995.

Ainu kamuy
Japanese goddesses